Merchant is a surname of Old French and Gujarati origin, meaning a merchant or trader, and was originally given as an occupational name to a buyer or seller of goods. It is shared by the following people:

Ajit Merchant (died 2011), Indian composer
Ali Merchant (born 1988), Indian actor
Andy Merchant (born 1950), American baseball player
Andy Merchant (coach) (born 1978), American baseball coach
Anthony Merchant (born 1944), Canadian lawyer and politician
Cameron Merchant (born 1984), Australian cricketer
Carolyn Merchant (born 1936), American ecofeminist philosopher and historian of science 
Firoz Merchant, Indian businessman in the United Arab Emirates
Gary Merchant, American politician
George Merchant (1926–2015), Scottish footballer
Henry Merchant (1918–1982), American baseball player
Hoshang Merchant (born 1947), Indian poet
Ismail Merchant (1936–2005), Indian-born film producer
J. Merchant (Sussex cricketer)
Jack Merchant (1899–1972), American athlete
Jessica Merchant (born 1983), American softball coach
Jimmy Merchant (born 1940), American musician
Kashif Merchant  (born 1994), Product Manager
Katherine Merchant (born 1985), English rugby union player
Kenneth Merchant, American accounting educator
Kishwer Merchant (born 1981), Indian actress
Larry Merchant (born 1931), American sportswriter and commentator 
Lisa Merchant, Canadian actress
Livingston T. Merchant (1903–1976), American diplomat
Louis A. Merchant (1860–1950), American politician
Mark Merchant (born 1969), American baseball player
Minhaz Merchant, Indian journalist
Moelwyn Merchant (1913–1997), Welsh academic, novelist, sculptor, poet and Anglican priest
Natalie Merchant (born 1963), American musician
Pana Merchant, (born 1943), Canadian politician
Piers Merchant (1951–2009), British politician 
Sabeeha Merchant (born 1959), Indian-born American plant biologist
Sabira Merchant (born 1942), Indian actress and etiquette trainer
Salim Merchant, Indian musician
Sally Merchant (1919–2007), Canadian television personality and politician
Stephen Merchant (born 1974), British writer, director, and comic actor
Sulaiman Merchant, Indian musician
Suzy Merchant (born 1969), American basketball coach
Tamzin Merchant (born 1987), British actress and poet
Tanzeel Merchant, Canadian architect and urban planner
Uday Merchant (1916–1985), Indian cricketer
Ursula Merchant (born 1932), German-born Las Vegas-based performance artist
Vaibhavi Merchant (born 1975), Indian dance choreographer
Verónica Merchant (born 1967), Mexican actress
Vijay Merchant (1911–1987), Indian cricketer
Vivien Merchant (1929–1982), British actress
William Alfred Merchant (1919–2001), English clown
Yahya Merchant (1903–1990), Indian architect
Yasin Merchant (born 1966), Indian professional snooker player
Sorana Merchant (born 2005), Romanian athlete and entrepreneur

See also
Kaufmann (in German)
Koopman (in Dutch)
Marchand (in French)
Mercator (disambiguation) (in Latin)

English-language surnames
Occupational surnames
English-language occupational surnames